Minimally invasive spine surgery, also known as MISS, has no specific meaning or definition. It implies a lack of severe surgical invasion. The older style of open-spine surgery for a relatively small disc problem used to require a 5-6 inch incision and a month in the hospital. MISS techniques utilize more modern technology, advanced imaging techniques and special medical equipment to reduce tissue trauma, bleeding, radiation exposure, infection risk, and decreased hospital stays by minimizing the size of the incision. Modern endoscopic procedures (see below) can be done through a 2 to 5 mm skin opening. By contrast, procedures done with a microscope require skin openings of approximately one inch, or more.

MISS can be used to treat a number of spinal conditions such as degenerative disc disease, disc herniation, fractures, tumors, infections, instability, and deformity. It also makes spine surgery possible for patients who were previously considered too high-risk for traditional surgery due to previous medical history or the complexity of the condition.

Methods
Traditionally, spine surgery has required surgeons to create a 5-6 inch incision down the affected portion of the spine and to pull back the tissue and muscle using retractors in order to reveal the bone. The wound itself takes a long time to heal; the aim of minimally invasive surgery is reduce tissue trauma and the associated bleeding and risk of infection by minimizing the size of the incision.

Some minimally invasive spine surgery may be performed by a spinal neurosurgeon or an orthopedic surgeon and a trained medical team. Typically, they will begin the operation by delivering a type of anesthesia that numbs a particular part of the body in conjunction with sedation or simply give a general anesthesia that prevents pain and allows the patient to sleep throughout the surgery.

Next, the surgeon may begin taking continuous X-ray images in real time, a process called fluoroscopy, of the affected portion of the spine. This allows them to see what they're operating on, in real-time, throughout the surgery without creating a large incision.

At this point, the surgeon may begin performing the operation, by creating an incision in the skin above the affected portion of the spine and then using a device called an obturator to push the underlying tissue apart; the obturator is inside a tube, which is left behind after the obturator is removed, leaving a channel down to the spine. Small operating tools as well as cameras and a light are used through this tube. In other surgeries this is called a trocar; in spine surgery it is called a "tubular retractor."

The surgeon makes the necessary repairs to the spine, extracting affected disc material out through the tubular retractor and inserting medical devices, such as intervertebral spacers, rods, pedicle screws, facet screws, nucleus replacement devices, and artificial discs, through the retractor.

Robot-assisted surgery is another technique that is used occasionally in minimally invasive spine surgery.

When the procedure is done the tube is removed, and the wound is stitched, stapled, or glued shut.

Specific procedures
There are many spinal procedures that make use of minimally invasive techniques. They can involve cutting away tissue (discectomy), fixing adjacent vertebrae to one another (spinal fusion), and replacing bone or other tissue.The main philosophy is least bloods, tissue damage, and keep bone/tissue architecture The name of the procedure often includes the region of the spine that is operated on, including cervical spine, thoracic spine, lumbar spine. These procedures include:
 Anterior cervical discectomy
 Artificial disc replacement or total disc replacement
 Epidural lysis of adhesions, also known as percutaneous adhesiolysis or the Racz procedure
 Laminectomy
 Laminotomy
 OLLIF Oblique lateral lumbar inter body fusion
 Percutaneous vertebroplasty, a.k.a. Kyphoplasty
 Endoscopic Discectomy

Small or ultra-small endoscopic discectomy (called Nano Endoscopic Discectomy or Endoscopic Transforaminal Lumbar Discectomy and Reconfiguration) does not have bone removal, like laminectomy or laminotomy. These procedures do not cause post-laminectomy syndrome (Failed back syndrome).

Risks and benefits
Risks include damage to nerves or muscles, a cerebrospinal fluid leak, and typical surgical risks, such as infection or a failure to resolve the condition that prompted the surgery.

Claims are made that the larger style of MISS has better outcomes than open surgery with respect to fewer complications and shorter hospital stays, but data supporting those claims is non-conclusive.

History
Humans have been trying to treat spinal pain for at least 5,000 years. The first evidence of spine surgery appeared in Egyptian mummies buried in 3,000 BC. However, Hippocrates is often credited with being the father of spine surgery due to the extensive amount of writing and proposed treatments he produced on the topic. The first operative spine surgery is credited to Paul of Aegina who lived during the 7th century.

However, only within the last 50 years have advances in digital fluoroscopy, image guidance, endoscopy and minimally invasive surgical tools allowed minimally invasive spine surgery to rise to the forefront of spinal procedures.

References

Minimally-invasive surgery
Surgical procedures and techniques